Claytown Troupe are an English alternative rock band from Bristol, England who came to success in 1989.

Early history – 1984 – 1988
The Claytown Troupe were formed in 1984 in Bristol by lead singer Christian Riou, who claimed in an NME interview that a local clairvoyant advised him to form a band called "the Clayton Troop" who would have success internationally & spend time in America which is exactly what happened to the band.
Between 1985 and 1987 the band were active on the Bristol live circuit supporting acts that included Fields of the Nephilim, Alien Sex Fiend, Chiefs of Relief, etc.. but failed to gain any industry attention so a line up change came in late 1987 and a whole new set of songs was written which became the album 'Through The Veil'
After recruiting guitarist Adrian Bennett & bassist Paul Waterson in early 1988, the band then created an accomplished live show, & having gained notoriety supporting acts such as Salvation, Lightning Strikes etc... through 1988 which built a hardcore fanbase with the audience who followed bands such as The Cult, New Model Army & The Mission.

During the summer of 1988 the band were included, along with The Wedding Present, The Trudy & The Hunters Club, on a 4-track EP on the cover of House of Dolls, a popular mainstream alternative music magazine, plus filmed a promotional video for the song Prayer through video production company 'Techniques of persuasion' who had produced for Pop Will Eat Itself and Morrissey.

Island Records – 1988 – 1991
In September 1988, Riou & Rick Williams spent a month meeting various A & R departments with the novelty of a pro-video rather than the standard demo tape. This generated interest & offers from various labels, and were signed to Island Records by Ron Fair, who also produced the debut album, Through the Veil with extra mixes by Ralph Jezzard.

With a major record deal behind them but no manager, they met small label owner Steve 'Abbo' Abbott (ex.UK Decay vocalist) and decided a sixth member rather an established team would help build the band, so asked him to switch to management for them.

The album was released to critical acclaim internationally in October 1989, reaching No. 72 on the UK Albums Chart .

'Through the Veil spawned three top 100 UK singles – "Prayer" UK 79, "Hey Lord" UK 86 and "Real Life" UK 85.

After Claytown Troupe played to sell-out audiences from London's famous Marquee Club and Astoria, they were invited to play as support band for The Cult's Sonic Temple tour, at venues such as Wembley Arena and Birmingham's National Exhibition Centre.

Following this success, and with a reputation as one of the UK's best live acts, the band toured constantly with a variety of acts including Pearl Jam, The Wonder Stuff, The Damned, Julian Cope, Jesus Jones, The Godfathers, and The Mission, as well as playing the Los Angeles Foundations Forum, which also featured Ozzy Osbourne and Soundgarden.

After Island Records sold to Polygram a new head of A & R came on board who on first meeting, told Christian Riou that he didn't like rock music & would find it hard working with the band, on Ron Fairs advice, the band switched record labels to EMI Records USA, where the second album Out There (1991), was produced by David Bianco at New York's The Hit Factory.

EMI Records – 1991 – 1992
'Out There' spawned two top 75 UK singles – "Ways of Love" UK No. 57, "Wanted It All" UK No. 74.

In 1992 as guests of Pearl Jam on their Ten Tour (the only UK act to have toured with Pearl Jam) the CTT were transferred to EMI UK after the US label was taken over by Zomba and the majority of non-US bands were dropped.

This move back to the UK in 1992 proved to be difficult, even after a successful UK headline tour which culminated with a sold out Marquee, rave music and the Madchester scenes had taken away a huge swath of the older audience, leaving the band in no-mans land between the old goth rock scene and the emerging grunge movement.

The track 'Skybound' was stopped a week before its release due to the fallout with the label and is now valued at £60 in Record Collector.

Reformation – 2004 
Riou and Williams continued to stay in touch but decided to go their separate ways, Williams working on various music projects with members of D:Ream & Jamiroquai, while Riou went on to work in film and television, recently producing films on Sid Vicious and the annual cinema documentary event I, Superbiker.

Then in 2004, they were invited to perform at the Whitby Gothic Weekend, this creating a renewed interest in the band, they then played a handful of gigs in late 2004 with interim members Clive Murray (guitar), Chris Sharp (bass) and Dan Roth (drums).

In 2008, the CTT were added as guests of The Mission's at the Shepherd's Bush Empire with Ben Christo from The Sisters of Mercy on guitar & later that year, with Spear of Destiny at the Islington Academy, London.

In 2011 the Claytown with Tim Stephens (EMF) guitar & Damon Williams (Horse London, The Almighty) Bass, shared a double headline with rock band Balaam and the Angel at the Islington Academy, London.

 2013 
Saw the band joined by drummer Phil Martini (Waywood Sons, Spear Of Destiny (band) and Joe Elliott's Down 'n' Outz) to play the Camden Rocks festival with Headliners The Rifles & Therapy?.

 2014 
The band played the Bristol Fleece, 22 years since their last hometown gig.

 2018 
Bristol Archive Records released the original 1988 demos that achieved the mainstream break through with major record labels as a red vinyl Ltd Edition 12".

Legacy
The Claytown Troupe were active in championing new bands & directly requesting them as support. Including The Almighty, The Beyond, Terrorvision & Christian Riou initially invited the fledgling Pearl Jam over to the UK as support which was reversed when the latter shot to international success in late 1991. The band also became a conduit for a number of individuals including band follower Jaquie Rice of Domino Records who Christian Riou helped her get her first role in the music industry. 2000ad Artist Will Simpson (comics) who went onto be the storyboard artist for Game of Thrones and designed the sleeves for both Real Life and Skybound.

Discography
Singles
 "Prayer" (1989) No. 78
 "Hey Lord" (1989) No. 86
 "Real Life" (1990) No. 85
 "Ways of Love" (1990) – UK No. 57
 "Wanted It All" (1992) – UK No. 74
 'Skybound' (1992) Unreleased

Albums
 Through the Veil (1989) (Island) – UK No. 72
 Out There'' (1991) (EMI)

See also
List of bands from England
List of bands from Bristol
Culture of Bristol

References

External links
Official Site

English alternative rock groups
Musical groups from Bristol
English gothic rock groups